Ronnie Silver (born July 20, 1951) is a former American stock car racer and crew chief. He raced in the NASCAR Busch Series for eight seasons, winning two races.

Career
A native of Asheville, North Carolina, Silver's career started in the Whelen All-American Series, in which he finished fourth in the 1982 Mid-Atlantic Region season. Eventually, Silver joined the Busch Series in its inaugural season as an owner driver, and finished 7th in the Southeastern 150 at Bristol Motor Speedway. Silver ended the season 15th in points with 1,514, along with 7 top tens and 2 top fives. In 1984, Silver was the car owner for Jack Ingram, who won the Busch 200 at Langley Speedway. In 1985, Silver claimed his first career NASCAR victory in the Bobby Isaac Memorial 200 at Hickory Motor Speedway; Silver won again at Hickory in 1986, this time in the Mountain Dew 400 after taking the lead from Jack Ingram with 11 laps left. In 1985 and 1986, Silver finished 8th (3268 points) and 7th (3927 points), respectively. In 1989, Silver's slow time trial for the All Pro 300 at Charlotte Motor Speedway relegated him to the 40-lap consolation race as a last chance to qualify for the event. However, Silver did not make the field. In 1992, Silver's team served Shawna Robinson at Daytona International Speedway, North Carolina Motor Speedway and Atlanta Motor Speedway, crashing at Daytona and Atlanta. The following season, Silver failed to qualify for The Pantry 300.

Later, Silver owned cars and served as crew chief for Michael Waltrip in the Busch Series, and currently works in the family auto body repair business. Eventually, Silver became the crew chief for Michael Waltrip Racing's Patty Moise in 1998 with engines supplied from Roush Racing, though in 2000, Silver worked less with the team due to business obligations in his hometown of Asheville, North Carolina.

Motorsports career results

NASCAR
(key) (Bold – Pole position awarded by qualifying time. Italics – Pole position earned by points standings or practice time. * – Most laps led.)

Winston Cup Series

Busch Series

ARCA Talladega SuperCar Series
(key) (Bold – Pole position awarded by qualifying time. Italics – Pole position earned by points standings or practice time. * – Most laps led.)

References

External links
 
 
 

Living people
1951 births
Sportspeople from Asheville, North Carolina
Racing drivers from North Carolina
NASCAR drivers
NASCAR crew chiefs
NASCAR team owners